Diamidophosphate (DAP) is the simplest phosphorodiamidate ion, with formula PO2(NH2)2−. It is a phosphorylating ion and was first used for phosphorylation of sugars in aqueous medium. DAP has attracted interest in the area of primordial chemistry.

Salts
Several salts of the formula MPO2(NH2)2(H2O)x are known.
The sodium salt can be made by base hydrolysis of phenyl phosphorodiamidate. It crystallises as a hexahydrate. It can be dehydrated.
The silver salt AgPO2(NH2)2  can react using double decomposition with bromides forming other salts.
The potassium diamidophosphate salt KPO2(NH2)2 is also known.
Phosphorodiamidic acid crystallizes as a trihydrate.

Reactions
Heating anhydrous sodium diamidophosphate causes polmerization: 
At 160 °C, Na2P2O4(NH)(NH2)2, Na3P3O6(NH)2(NH2)2, Na4P4O8(NH)3(NH2)2, Na5P5O10(NH)4(NH2)2 and Na6P6O12(NH)5(NH2)2 are produced. These substances contain P-N-P backbones. These can be separated by paper chromatography.
At 200 °C the hexa-phosphate is produced.
At 250 °C the typical chain length is 18.

Heating hydrated salts induces loss of ammonia to form oligophosphates and polyphosphates.

Diamidophosphate inhibits urease enzymes by blocking up the active site, binding to two nickel centers. Diamidophosphate mimics the urea hydrolysis intermediate.

Diamidophosphate is tribasic, and the amine groups may also lose hydrogen to form more metallic salts. With silver, further reactions can yield explosive salts: tetrasilver orthodiamidophosphate (AgO)3P(NH2)NHAg, and pentasilver orthodiamidophosphate (AgO)3P(NHAg)2.

Organic esters and amides

Numerous organic derivatives are known. One example is phenyl phosphorodiamidate.

Reactions with nucleosides
DAP phosphorylates deoxynucleosides (the building blocks of DNA, and at the same time initiates polymerization to make DNA. DAP  facilitates the synthesis of larger RNA sequences (ribozymes) from smaller RNA strands. Other nitrogenous derivatives of phosphorus derivatives have also been proposed in this context in a review article.

See also

 Abiogenesis

References

Other reading

Phosphorus compounds
Amines